Juan Bautista Miritello (born 8 February 1999) is an Argentine professional footballer who plays as a forward for San Martín de Tucumán, on loan from Defensa y Justicia.

Career
Miritello began his youth career in Luján with San Lorenzo, prior to having stints with Club Luján and Independiente. He soon departed to progress through the Defensa y Justicia youth ranks. He was promoted into senior football in October 2019 by manager Mariano Soso, who selected the forward as a substitute for a Primera División fixture with San Lorenzo. Miritello was subsequently subbed on for his professional debut, as he replaced Fernando Márquez with fourteen minutes remaining of a 3–1 win at the Estadio Pedro Bidegain on 30 October. Miritello spent the end of 2019–20 on loan in Primera B Metropolitana with Flandria.

Miritello scored his first senior goal, whilst with Flandria, on 29 February 2020 versus Fénix; in what was his penultimate match for the club due to the COVID-19 pandemic. In the following years, Miritello spent time on loan at clubs such as Real Pilar, Talleres RE and San Martín de Tucumán.

Career statistics
.

References

External links

1999 births
Living people
People from Florencio Varela Partido
Argentine footballers
Association football forwards
Argentine Primera División players
Primera B Metropolitana players
Club Luján footballers
Club Atlético Independiente footballers
Defensa y Justicia footballers
Flandria footballers
Real Pilar Fútbol Club players
Talleres de Remedios de Escalada footballers
San Martín de Tucumán footballers
Sportspeople from Buenos Aires Province